The Sudan Journal of Medical Sciences  (SJMS ) is an English-language quarterly peer-reviewed academic journal covering medical research topics.

Publication history

SJMS is an open access medical journal published by Knowledge E that publishes original research articles, review articles, case reports, letters to the Editor and commentaries in all areas of medical sciences. It is a project of the Continuous Professional Development Program at  Faculty of Medicine, Omdurman Islamic University
SJMS is fully open access journal that endorses the International Committee of Medical Journal Editors (ICMJE) and adheres to Committee on Publication Ethics (COPE) Core practices. SJMS is archived in Portico archive, which provides long-term archiving service for electronic scholarly journals. Hosting and Production services are provided by Knowledge E.

Abstracting and indexing
Sudan Journal of Medical Sciences  is abstracted and indexed in EBSCOhost, African Journals Online (AJOL), Directory of Open Access Journals (DOAJ),  Microsoft Academic Search, Google Scholar, African index Medicus, IMEMR Index Medixus for the Eastern Mediterranean Region.

See also
List of medical journals

References 

General medical journals
English-language journals
Quarterly journals